Brachybacterium muris is a species of Gram positive, strictly aerobic, yellow-pigmented bacterium. The cells are coccoid during the stationary phase, and irregular rods during the exponential phase. It was first isolated from the liver of a laboratory mouse. The species was first described in 2003, and the name is derived from the Latin muris (mouse).

The optimum growth temperature for B. muris is 25-37 °C. It can grow in the 15-42 °C range and in pH 6.0-9.0.

References

External links 

Type strain of Brachybacterium muris at BacDive -  the Bacterial Diversity Metadatabase

Micrococcales
Bacteria described in 2003